GNAC may refer to:

Great Northeast Athletic Conference, an NCAA Division III sports league in the Northeast United States
Great Northwest Athletic Conference, an NCAA Division II sports league in the Northwest United States
gnac, pseudonym used by British songwriter and music producer Mark Tranmer